Taborstraße  is a station on  of the Vienna U-Bahn. It is located in the Leopoldstadt District. It opened in 2008.

References

External links 
 

Buildings and structures in Leopoldstadt
Railway stations opened in 2008
Vienna U-Bahn stations